Richardson Hitchins (born September 26, 1997) is an American professional boxer. As an amateur he represented Haiti at the 2016 Summer Olympics in Rio de Janeiro, where he lost to Gary Antuanne Russell.

Hitchins was born in Brooklyn to Haitian parents. Having failed to qualify for the U.S. Olympic team, he decided to represent his parents' country instead. He is currently signed with  Matchroom Boxing. He was previously signed with Mayweather Promotions founded by Floyd Mayweather Jr.

Professional boxing record

References

1997 births
Sportspeople from Brooklyn
Boxers from New York City
Haitian male boxers
Olympic boxers of Haiti
Living people
Boxers at the 2016 Summer Olympics
American sportspeople of Haitian descent
Light-welterweight boxers
Welterweight boxers
African-American boxers
21st-century African-American sportspeople